Surattha africalis is a species of moth in the family Crambidae. It is found in Kenya, Namibia, South Africa, Sudan and Tanzania.

References

Moths described in 1919
Moths of Sub-Saharan Africa
Ancylolomiini